Bassem Balaa, born July 10, 1981 in Beirut Lebanon, is a retired Lebanese professional basketball player He has also represented the Lebanon national basketball team that participated in the 2002 FIBA World Championship in Indianapolis and the 2006 FIBA World Championship in Japan. Bassem has played for various clubs within Lebanon, including Sporting Al Riyadi Beirut and Achrafieh side Hekmeh BC.

References

External links 
 

1981 births
Living people
Lebanese men's basketball players
Sportspeople from Beirut
Basketball players at the 2006 Asian Games
Small forwards
2006 FIBA World Championship players
Asian Games competitors for Lebanon
Sagesse SC basketball players
Al Riyadi Club Beirut basketball players